Arteriovenous refers to relations between arteries and veins, such as:
Arteriovenous malformation
Arteriovenous fistula
Arteriovenous oxygen difference
Arteriovenous anastomosis